Scopula asopiata is a moth of the family Geometridae. It is found in French Guiana.

References

Moths described in 1858
asopiata
Endemic fauna of French Guiana
Moths of South America
Taxa named by Achille Guenée